Levi E. Knapp (December 5, 1826 – September 13, 1919) was a member of the Wisconsin State Assembly.

Biography
Knapp was born on December 5, 1826, in Sherburne, New York. In 1852, he settled in Oshkosh, Wisconsin. He died there on September 13, 1919.

Career
Knapp was a member of the Assembly during the 1877 and 1878 sessions. Previously, he had been a member of the county board of Winnebago County, Wisconsin from 1872 to 1875. He was a Republican.

References

External links

People from Sherburne, New York
Politicians from Oshkosh, Wisconsin
County supervisors in Wisconsin
1826 births
1919 deaths
Burials in Wisconsin
19th-century American politicians
Republican Party members of the Wisconsin State Assembly